CHJ or chj may refer to:
 Chj (trigraph), used in Corsican to represent the sound /c/
 Charles Hollis Jones, founder of CHJ Designs
 Chinantec of Ojitlán, a language with ISO 639 code 'chj'
 Chipinge Airport, IATA code 'CHJ'